Bolandiol (INN, also known as 19-nor-4-androstenediol, estr-4-ene-3β,17β-diol, or 3β-dihydronandrolone) is an anabolic-androgenic steroid (AAS) that was never marketed. However, a dipropionate ester derivative, bolandiol dipropionate, has been marketed. Bolandiol and its dipropionate ester are unique among AASs in that they reportedly also possesses estrogenic and progestogenic activity.

Bolandiol is on the World Anti-Doping Agency's list of prohibited substances, and is therefore banned from use in most major sports.  It is a potential metabolic precursor to nandrolone. However, several clinical studies have concluded that bolandiol does not alter strength, body composition, or exercise performance.

See also 
 4-Androstenediol
 19-Nor-5-androstenediol
 19-Nor-5-androstenedione
 Bolandione (19-nor-4-androstenedione)
 Bolenol (17α-ethyl-19-nor-5-androstenol)

References 

Androgens and anabolic steroids
Estranes
Estrogens
Prodrugs
Progestogens
World Anti-Doping Agency prohibited substances
Cyclohexenols
Cyclopentanols
Abandoned drugs